Paul Dundas (born 1952) is a scholar and a senior lecturer in Sanskrit language and head of Asian Studies in the University of Edinburgh. His main areas of academic and research interest include Jainism, Buddhism, classical Sanskrit literature and Middle Indo-Aryan philology. He is regarded as one of the leading western scholars in Jain studies. 

He is currently a member of the Council of the Pali Text Society.

Bibliography and research papers

Bibliography
Following is the partial list of his books:

Dundas, P. (1992). The Jains.  The Library of religious beliefs and practices. London: Routledge. 
Dundas, P. (1998). The meat at the wedding feasts: Kr̥ṣṇa, vegetarianism and a Jain dispute.   [Toronto]: Centre for South Asian Studies, University of Toronto. OCLC Number: 43745945
Alphen, J. v., Pal, P., & Dundas, P. (2000). Steps to liberation: 2,500 years of Jain art and religion.  Antwerpen: Etnografisch Museum. OCLC Number: 44834857
Dundas, P. (2007). History, scripture and controversy in a medieval Jain sect.  Routledge advances in Jaina studies. London: Routledge.   OCLC Number: 68373250
Dundas, P (2017). Editing and translation of Magha's The Killing of Shishupala, Murty Classical Library of India, Harvard University Press.

Research papers and conferences

"Conversion to Jainism : Historical Perspectives" in R. Robinson and S. Clarke ( ed. ), Religious Conversion in India: Modes, Motivations, and Meanings, New Delhi: Oxford University Press 2003, pp. 125–48.
"Haribhadra's Lalitavistara and the legend of Siddharsi's conversion to Jainism", in O. Qvarnstrom (ed. ), Jainism and Early Buddhism: Essays in Honor of Padmanabh S. Jaini, Fremont: Asian Humanities Press 2003, 151–66.
"Beyond Anekantavada: A Jain Approach to Religious Tolerance", in T. Sethia ( ed. ), Ahimsa, Anekanta and Jainism, New Delhi: Motilal Banarsidass 2004, 123–36.
Il Jainismo: L'antica religione indiana della non-violenza; Prefazione di Raffaele Torella, Roma: Castelvecchi 2005 (Italian translation of The Jains, second enlarged edition, London and New York Routledge 2002).
"A Non-Imperial Religion? Jainism in its 'Dark Age'", in P. Olivelle (ed.), Between the Empires: Society in India 300BCE-400BCE,  New York: Oxford University Press, 2006, pp. 383–414.
"The Later Fortunes of Jamali", in P. Flugel (ed.), Studies in Jaina History and Culture: Disputes and dialogues, London and New York: Routledge 2006, pp. 33–60.

Current and imminent projects
A translation with commentary of Yasovijaya's Dvatrimsaddvatrimsika.
A study of the historical representation of the Jain Pancanamaskara mantra, with particular reference to Yasovijaya's Arhadgita.
A systematic investigation of the Sanskrit and Prakrit texts of the "Haribhadra corpus".

References

Scholars of Jainism
British Sanskrit scholars
British Indologists
Living people
1952 births
Academics of the University of Edinburgh